Resonance – Journal of Science Education is a monthly peer-reviewed academic journal covering science education. It is currently being published by Springer Science+Business Media on behalf of the Indian Academy of Sciences and the editor-in-chief is Prof. B Sury. The journal was established in 1996.

Abstracting and indexing
The journal is abstracted and indexed in:
CSA Environmental Sciences
EBSCO databases
Indian Science Abstracts
ProQuest databases
Scopus
Emerging Sources Citation Index

References

External links

Science education journals
Springer Science+Business Media academic journals
Monthly journals
English-language journals
Publications established in 1996